Kalash - Ek Vishwaas is an Indian soap opera that premiered on 23 March 2015 on Life OK. The show was produced by Ekta Kapoor and Shobha Kapoor under their banner Balaji Telefilms. The show stars Aparna Dixit and Krip Suri. The show is named after Ekta Kapoor's Kalash that aired on Star Plus from 2001 to 2003. The show ended on 17 March 2017.

Reruns of the show also aired on Star Utsav under the title Devika...Ambe Maa Ki Ladli. This show is being re-telecasted on Shemaroo TV from 8 April 2021.

Plot

Devika Deol is a gentle great devotee of goddess Ambe Maa, set to wed Saket Kapoor. Ravi Garewal, a middle-class guy hails from Ambala. Due to some circumstances he marries and saves Devika from social humiliation. Manju, Shweta and Saket cause problems in Devika's life. She and Ravi fall in love. Nivedita Luthra (boss of the prestigious company where Ravi works) becomes obsessed with him. She, Manju and Saket push Devika off a cliff, assuming her dead.

Several months later

Devika is still alive and disguises as Ambika Raichand, the daughter of her rich and influential saviour Janki. Ravi is engaged to Nivedita, living in her house. Devika is back for revenge, thinking Ravi was part of the plan to kill her. She later realises his innocence; they start a new life. Nivedita and Saket kill Monty and blame Ravi but Devika exposes them. The show ends with her pregnancy.

Cast

Main
Aparna Dixit as Devika Deol Garewal: Ravi's wife; Ambika Raichand's imposter; Prakhar Deol's daughter; Abhay and Sakshi's sister; Pallavi's cousin; Saket's former fiancée (2015–2017)
Krip Suri as Ravi Garewal: Devika's husband; Manju and Dashrath's son; Vikas and Addy's brother; Monty's cousin; Nivedita's former fiancé (2015–2017)

Recurring
Alka Amin as Manjari "Manju" Garewal: Dashrath's wife; Ravi, Vikas and Addy's mother (2015–2017)
Dolly Sohi as Janki Devi Raichand: Ambika's mother; Devika's foster mother (2016–2017)
Mahesh Shetty as Saket Kapoor: Usha's son; Shweta's brother; Devika's former fiancé (2015-2017)
Parakh Madan/Seema Mishra as Nivedita Luthra: Rajmohan's daughter; Paritosh's sister; Ravi's former fiancée (2015–2017)
Mamta Luthra as Usha Kapoor: Saket and Shweta's mother (2015–2017)
Shritama Mukherjee/Donal Bisht as Sakshi Deol Garewal: Prakhar's daughter; Abhay and Devika's sister; Pallavi's cousin; Monty's widow (2015–2017)
Aditya Bakshi as Manveer "Monty" Garewal: Kulwinder and Vijayrath's son; Ravi, Vikas and Addy's cousin; Sakshi's husband (2015–2017)
Priyanka Purohit/Sabina Jat as Pallavi Kumari Deol: Rekha and Shekhar's daughter; Abhay, Devika and Sakshi's cousin (2015–2017)
Manni Boparai as Shweta Kapoor Garewal: Usha's daughter; Saket's sister; Vikas's wife (2015–2017)
Madhur Arora as Vikas Garewal: Manju and Dashrath's son; Ravi and Addy's brother; Monty's cousin; Shweta's husband (2015–2017)
Neena Cheema as Savitri Deol: Manohar's wife; Prakhar and Shekhar's mother; Abhay, Devika, Sakshi and Pallavi's grandmother (2015–2016)
Mukul Harish as Paritosh Luthra: Rajmohan's son; Nivedita's brother (2015)
Gaurav Nanda as Mayank Mittal (2015)
Sangeeta Kapure as Rekha Kaur Deol: Shekhar's wife; Pallavi's mother (2015–2017)
Aashu Kohli as Shekhar Deol: Savitri and Manohar's son; Prakhar's brother; Pallavi's father (2015–2016)
Anil Rastogi as Manohar Deol: Savitri's husband; Prakhar and Shekhar's father; Abhay, Devika, Sakshi and Pallavi's grandfather (2015)
Parag Tyagi as Abhay Deol: Prakhar Deol's son; Devika and Sakshi's elder brother; Pallavi's cousin (2015)
 Kohposh Sapru as Aadesh "Addy" Garewal: Manju and Dashrath's son; Ravi and Vikas's brother; Monty's cousin (2015)
Deepak Qazir Kejriwal as Rakesh Luthra: Nivedita and Paritosh's father (2015)
Unknown as Kulwinder Garewal: Vijayrath's wife; Monty's mother (2015–2017)
 Pooja Gor as Roshni 
 Lankesh Bhardwaj as Police Inspector

References

External links
 Kalash...Ek Vishwaas on hotstar

Balaji Telefilms television series
Indian television soap operas
2015 Indian television series debuts
2017 Indian television series endings
Life OK original programming
Television shows set in Mumbai